Hell Hath No Fury may refer to:

Literature
 "Hell hath no fury", an interpreted line based on a quotation from the 1697 play The Mourning Bride by William Congreve
 Hell Hath No Fury, a 2008 novel by David Weber and Linda Evans
 Hell Hath No Fury, a 1953 crime novel by Charles Williams

Television
 "Hell Hath No Fury" (Charmed), an episode of Charmed
 "Hell Hath No Fury", an episode of GCB
 "Hell Hath No Fury", an episode of Castle
 "Hell Hath No Fury", an episode of La Femme Nikita
 "Hell Hath No Fury", an episode of Scandal

Music

Albums
 Hell Hath No Fury (Clipse album), 2006
 Hell Hath No Fury (Rock Goddess album), 1983
 Hell Hath No Fury (Civet album), 2008

Songs
 "Hell Hath No Fury", song by Frankie Laine and Cahn Brodszky
 "Hell Hath No Fury", song by Rock Goddess (1984)
 "Hell Hath No Fury", song by Klute (2007)
 "Hel Hath No Fury", song by Týr (2013)
 "Hell Hath No Fury", song by Youngblood Supercult (2016)
 "Hell Hath No Fury", song by Blues Saraceno (2018)

Other arts and entertainment
 Hell Hath No Fury (film), a 1991 TV film
 "Hell Hath No Fury", a chapter in volume 10 of the manga Beastars by Paru Itagaki

See also
 Hell Hath No Fury Like a Woman Scorned, a 2014 musical play by Tyler Perry
 "Like a Woman Scorned", a 2019 song by Theo Katzman
 Hell Hath Fury (disambiguation)